The following list contains the most-streamed artists on the audio streaming platform Spotify.

As of March 2023, Canadian rapper Drake is the most-streamed artist of all time on Spotify, while American singer-songwriter Taylor Swift is the most-streamed female artist. Since 2013, Spotify has published a yearly list of its most-streamed artists, which has been topped by Drake and Puerto Rican rapper Bad Bunny a record three times, with Bad Bunny being the only artist to do so in consecutive years (2020–2022).

Most-streamed artists

By year

Number of streams are listed in parenthesis, where available.

By decade
Number of streams are listed in parenthesis, where available.

First 10 years
The most streamed artists in the first 10 years of the existence of Spotify.

Most monthly listeners

Canadian singer The Weeknd is the artist with the most monthly listeners on Spotify, while American singer-songwriter Miley Cyrus is the female artist with the most monthly listeners.

Timeline of peak monthly listeners 
This is a timeline of artists who had the most monthly listeners on Spotify since September 2015, when the feature was made public.

2015

2016

2017

2018

2019

2020

2021

2022

2023

See also
 List of most-streamed songs on Spotify
 List of most-viewed YouTube channels
 List of most-subscribed YouTube channels
 List of most-subscribed YouTube Music artists
 List of most-followed Facebook pages
 List of most-followed TikTok accounts
 List of most-followed Twitch channels
 List of most-followed Twitter accounts
 List of most-followed Instagram accounts
 Spotify

References

21st century-related lists
Lists of 21st-century people
Music-related lists
Lists of Internet-related superlatives
Spotify
Spotify artists